Maronite (Catholic) Apostolic Exarchate of Colombia (in Latin: Exarchatus Apostolicus Columbiae) is the Apostolic Exarchate (Eastern Catholic missionary jurisdiction) of the Maronite Church (Antiochian Rite in Arabic) for all Colombia, in South America, concurrent with a Latin hierarchy and other Eastern Catholic dioceses.

Its exarchial see is the Marian Pro-Cathedral Parroquia de Nuestra Señora del Líbano dedicated to Our Lady of Lebanon, in Colombian capital Bogotá, Distrito Capital de Bogotá.

It is  immediately subject to the Holy See (notably the Roman Congregation for the Eastern Churches) and its current head is Apostolic Exarch Fadi Abou Chebel.

History 
The Maronite Apostolic Exarchate was erected by Pope Francis on 20 January 2016,  Its first Apostolic Exarch, without episcopal character, is Fadi Abou Chebel, OMM, also appointed apostolic visitor of the Maronite faithful living in Peru and Ecuador.

Ordinaries 
(Maronite Rite)

Apostolic Exarchs
 Fadi Abou Chebel, Mariamite Maronite Order (O.M.M.) (20 January 2016 - ...)

References

Sources and external links 
 Catholic Hierarchy 
 GCatholic 

Maronite Catholic apostolic exarchates